Opisthotropis  tamdaoensis  is a species of natricine snake found in Vietnam.

References

Opisthotropis
Reptiles described in 2008
Reptiles of Vietnam